

Colleges affiliated with University of Calcutta 
For the list of colleges under University of Calcutta, see the article.

Colleges affiliated with Bankura University

 Bankura Christian College
 Bankura Sammilani College
 Bankura Zilla Saradamani Mahila Mahavidyapith
 Barjora College
 Birsha Munda Memorial College
 Chatra Ramai Pandit Mahavidyalaya
 Chhatna Chandidas Mahavidyalaya
 Gobindaprasad Mahavidyalaya
 Indas Mahavidyalaya
 Jamini Roy College
 Khatra Adibasi Mahavidyalaya
 Onda Thana Mahavidyalaya
 Panchmura Mahavidyalaya
 Pandit Raghunath Murmu Smriti Mahavidyalaya
 Patrasayer Mahavidyalaya
 Raipur Block Mahavidyalaya
 Ramananda College
 Saldiha College
 Saltora Netaji Centenary College
 Sonamukhi College
 Swami Dhananjoy Das Kathiababa Mahavidyalaya
 Government General Degree College, Mejia
 Government General Degree College, Ranibandh
 Akui Kamalabala Women's College

Colleges affiliated with The University of Burdwan

 Abhedananda Mahavidyalaya
 Acharya Sukumar Sen Mahavidyalaya
 Aghorekamini Prakashchandra Mahavidyalaya
 Arambagh Girls' College
 Balagarh Bijoy Krishna Mahavidyalaya
 Bejoy Narayan Mahavidyalaya
 Bengal Law College
 Birbhum Mahavidyalaya
 Bolpur College
 Burdwan Raj College
 Chandernagore Government College
 Chandidas Mahavidyalaya
 Chandrapur College
 Dasarathi Hazra Memorial College
 Deshbandhu Mahavidyalaya
 Dr. Bhupendra Nath Dutta Smriti Mahavidyalaya
 Dr. Gourmohan Roy College
 Galsi Mahavidyalaya
 Gushkara Mahavidyalaya
 Hiralal Bhakat College
 Hooghly Mohsin College
 Hooghly Women's College

Colleges affiliated with Kazi Nazrul University

 Asansol Girls' College
 Banwarilal Bhalotia College
 Bidhan Chandra College, Asansol
 St. Xavier's College, Asansol
 Kulti College
 Deshbandhu Mahavidyalaya
 Kazi Nazrul Islam Mahavidyalaya
 Triveni Devi Bhalotia College
 Raniganj Girls' College
 Durgapur Government College
 Michael Madhusudan Memorial College
 Durgapur Women's College
 Durgapur College of Commerce and Science
 Khandra College
 Pandaveswar College

Colleges affiliated with University of Kalyani

Asannagar Madan Mohan Tarkalankar College
Berhampore College
Berhampore Girls' College
Bethuadahari College
Chakdaha College
Chapra Bangaljhi Mahavidyalaya
Chapra Government College
Domkal Girl's College
Dr. B.R. Ambedkar College
Dukhulal Nibaran Chandra College
Dumkal College
Dwijendralal College
 G.D.College
Haringhata Mahavidyalaya
Hazi A.K. Khan College
Jalangi Mahavidyalaya
Jangipur College
Jatindra Rajendra Mahavidyalaya
Kaliganj Government College
Kalyani Mahavidyalaya
Kanchrapara College
Kandi Raj College
Karimpur Pannadevi College
Krishnagar Government College 
Krishnagar Women's College
Krishnath College
Lalgola College
Muragacha Government College
Murshidabad Adarsha Mahavidyalaya
Muzaffar Ahmed Mahavidyalaya
Nabadwip Vidyasagar College
Nabagram Amar Chand Kundu College
Nagar College
Nur Mohammad Smriti Mahavidyalaya
Panchthupi Haripada Gouribala College
Plassey College
Pritilata Mahila Mahavidyalaya
Prof. Sayed Nurul Hasan College
Raja Birendra Chandra College
Ranaghat College
Rani Dhanya Kumari College
Sagardighi Kamada Kinkar Smriti Mahavidyalaya
Santipur College
Srikrishna College
Sripat Singh College
Sewnarayan Rameswar Fatepuria College
Subhas Chandra Bose Centenary College
Sudhiranjan Lahiri Mahavidyalaya 
Tehatta Government College
Tagore School of Rural Development and Agriculture Management
Snehangshu Kanta Acharya Institute of Law
Bimal Chandra College of Law
J.R.S.E.T. College of Law
Mohammad Abdul Bari Institute of Juridical Science

Colleges affiliated with Sidho-Kanho-Birsha University

 Achhruram Memorial College
 Ananda Marga College
 Arsha College
 Balarampur College
 Bandwan Mahavidyalaya
 Barabazar Bikram Tudu Memorial College
 Bikramjit Goswami Memorial College
 Chitta Mahato Memorial College
 Government General Degree College, Manbazar II
 J. K. College
 Kashipur Michael Madhusudhan Mahavidyalaya
 Kotshila Mahavidyalaya
 Mahatma Gandhi College, Purulia
 Manbhum Mahavidyalaya
 Netaji Subhash Ashram Mahavidyalaya
 Nistarini Women's College
 Panchakot Mahavidyalaya
 Raghunathpur College
 Ramananda Centenary College
 Santaldih College
 Sitaram Mahato Memorial College

Colleges affiliated with Vidyasagar University

 Ambigeria Government College
 Bajkul Milani Mahavidyalaya
 Belda College
 Bhatter College
 Chaipat S.P.B. Mahavidyalaya
 Chandrakona Vidyasagar Mahavidyalaya
 Debra Thana Sahid Kshudiram Smriti Mahavidyalaya
 Deshapran Mahavidyalaya
 Egra Sarada Shashi Bhusan College
 Garhbeta College
 Gourav Guin Memorial College
 Government General Degree College, Gopiballavpur-II
 Government General Degree College, Mohanpur
 Haldia Government College
 Haldia Law College
 Hijli College
 Jhargram Raj College
 Jhargram Raj College (Girls Wing)
 K.D. College of Commerce and General Studies
 Keshiary Government College
 Kharagpur College
 Khejuri College
 Lalgarh Government College
 Maharaja Nandakumar Mahavidyalaya
 Mahishadal Girls College
 Mahishadal Raj College
 Midnapore College
 Midnapore Law College
 MIES R.M. Law College
 Moyna College
 Mugberia Gangadhar Mahavidyalaya
 Narajole Raj College
 Nayagram Pandit Raghunath Murmu Government College
 Oriental Institute of Science and Technology, Midnapore
 Panskura Banamali College
 Pingla Thana Mahavidyalaya
 Prabhat Kumar College
 Rabindra Bharati Mahavidyalaya
 Raja Narendra Lal Khan Women's College
 Ramnagar College
 Sabang Sajanikanta Mahavidyalaya
 Salboni Government College
 Sankrail Anil Biswas Smriti Mahavidyalaya
 Santal Bidroha Sardha Satabarsiki Mahavidyalaya
 Seva Bharati Mahavidyalaya
 Shahid Matangini Hazra Government College for Women
 Siddhinath Mahavidyalaya
 Silda Chandra Sekhar College
 Sitananda College
 Subarnarekha Mahavidyalaya
 Sukumar Sengupta Mahavidyalaya
 Swarnamoyee Jogendranath Mahavidyalaya
 Tamralipta Mahavidyalaya
 Vidyasagar Institute of Health
 Vidyasagar School of Social Work
 Vivekananda Mission Mahavidyalaya
 Vivekananda Satavarshiki Mahavidyalaya
 Yogoda Satsanga Palpara Mahavidyalaya

Colleges affiliated with West Bengal State University 
The column contains the list of colleges under West Bengal State University

 Acharya Prafulla Chandra College, New Barrackpore
 Ali Yavar Jung National Institute of Speech and Hearing Disabilities
 Amdanga Jugal Kishore Mahavidyalaya
 Bamanpukur Humayun Kabir Mahavidyalaya
 Banipur Mahila Mahavidyalaya
 Barasat College
 Barasat Government College
 Barrackpore Rastraguru Surendranath College
 Basirhat College
 Bhairab Ganguly College
 Bidhannagar College
 Bikashayan, 40, Bonhoogly Govt Colony, Alambazar
 Brahmananda Keshab Chandra College
 Chandraketugarh Sahidullah Smriti Mahavidyalaya
 Derozio Memorial College
 Dinabandhu Mahavidyalay
 Dr. A.P.J. Abdul Kalam Government College
 Dr. B. R. Ambedkar Satabarshiki Mahavidyalaya
 Dum Dum Motijheel Rabindra Mahavidyalaya
 Dum Dum Motijheel College
 East Calcutta Girl's College
 Gobardanga Hindu College
 GLF Business School, Sector I, Salt Lake
 Hingalganj Mahavidyalaya
 Hiralal Majumdar Memorial College for Women
 Kalinagar Mahavidyalaya
 Kingston College of Science
 Kingston Law College
 Mahadevananda Mahavidyalaya
 Morning Star College
 Mrinalini Dutta Mahavidyapith
 Maharajah's College, (Balisa) Bira
 Naba Barrackpore Prafulla Chandra Mahavidyalaya
 Nahata Jogendranath Mandal Smriti Mahavidyalaya
 National Institute for the Mentally Handicapped, B.T. Road, Bon Hoogly
 Netaji Satabarshiki Mahavidyalaya
 P. N. Das College
 P. R. Thakur Government College
 Panihati Mahavidyalaya
 Post Graduate Government Institute for Physical Education
 Prasanta Chandra Mahalanobis Mahavidyalaya
 Ramakrishna Sarada Mission Vivekananda Vidyabhavan
 Ramakrishna Mission Vivekananda Centenary College
 Rishi Bankim Chandra College
 Sarojini Naidu College for Women
 Saheed Nurul Islam Mahavidyalaya
 Sarada Ma Girls College
 Sree Chaitanya College
 Sree Chaitanya Mahavidyalaya
 Taki Government College
 Vivekananda College
 Institute of Science and Advanced Research

Colleges affiliated with Cooch Behar Panchanan Barma University

Colleges affiliated with University of North Bengal 

 Acharya Prafulla Chandra Roy Government College
 Alipurduar College
 Alipurduar Mahila Mahavidyalaya
 Ananda Chandra College
 Ananda Chandra College of Commerce
 Banarhat Kartik Oraon Hindi Government College
 Bijanbari Degree College
 Birpara College
 Birsa Munda College
 Chopra Kamala Paul Smriti Mahavidyalaya
 Cluny Women's College
 Darjeeling Government College
 Dhupguri Girl's College
 Falakata College
 Ghoom-Jorebunglow Degree College
 Ghoshpukur College
 Government General Degree College, Gorubathan
 Government General Degree College, Pedong
 Gyan Jyoti College
 Indian Institute of Legal Studies
 Islampur College
 Jalpaiguri Law College
 Kalimpong College
 Kalipada Ghosh Tarai Mahavidyalaya
 Kurseong College
 Lilabati Mahavidyalaya
 Maynaguri College
 Mirik College
 Munshi Premchand Mahavidyalaya
 Nakshalbari College
 Model B.P.Ed. College
 Nani Bhattacharya Smarak Mahavidyalaya
 North Bengal St. Xavier's College
 P.D. Women's College
 Parimal Mitra Smriti Mahavidyalaya
 Pijushkanti Mukherjee Mahavidyalaya
 Rajganj College
 Sahid Kshudiram Mahavidyalaya
 St Joseph's College, Darjeeling
 Salesian College, Darjeeling
 Samuktala Sidhu Kanhu College
 Siliguri College
 Siliguri College of Commerce
 Siliguri Mahila Mahavidyalaya
 Sonada Degree College
 Southfield College
 Sukanta Mahavidyalaya
 Suniti Academy
 Surya Sen Mahavidyalaya
 Vivekananda College, Alipurduar
 University B.T. & Evening College

Colleges affiliated with University of Gour Banga 

 Balurghat College
 Balurghat Law College
 Balurghat Mahila Mahavidyalaya
 Buniadpur Mahavidyalaya
 Chanchal College
 Dewan Abdul Goni College
 Dr. Meghnad Saha College
 Gangarampur B.Ed College
 Gangarampur College
 Gazole Mahavidyalaya
 Gour Mahavidyalaya
 Harishchandrapur College
 Jamini Majumdar Memorial College
 Kaliachak College
 Kaliyaganj College
 Kumarganj College
 Kushmandi Government College
 Malda College
 Malda Women's College
 Manikchak College
 Nathaniyal Murmu Memorial College
 Pakuahat Degree College
 Raiganj Surendranath Mahavidyalaya
 S.B.S. Government College, Hili
 Samsi College
 Shree Agrasen Mahavidyalaya
 South Malda College

See also 

 List of institutions of higher education in India
 List of schools in India

References

External links 
 "(Calcutta): Academic Institutes." Calcuttaweb.com. Accessed July 2012.
 "Bankura University" Bankura University accessed Feb 2021.
 "Colleges in West Bengal"

Colleges